The Ceutrones (or Centrones) were a Gallic tribe dwelling in the Tarantaise Valley, in modern Savoie, during the Iron Age and Roman period.

Name 
They are mentioned as Ceutrones by Caesar (mid-1st c. BC), Keútrōnes (Κεύτρωνες; var. Κέντ-) by Strabo (early 1st c. AD), Ceutrones by Pliny (1st c. AD), and as Keutrónōn (Κευτρόνων) by Ptolemy (2nd c. AD).

The hamlet of Centron, located in the village of Montgirod, may be named after the Gallic tribe.

They had a homonym tribe in Gallia Belgica, documented in 54 BC, which was probably a pagus of the Nervii.

Geography 

The Ceutrones dwelled in the Tarantaise Valley, along the upper Isère river, near the Little St Bernard Pass (Alpis Graia) on the route stretching from the Rhône Valley to the north of the Italian Peninsula. Their territory was located north of the Graioceli and Medulli, southeast of the Allobroges, southwest of the Veragri, and west of the Salassi, on the other side of the Alps.

Their chief town was known as Axima (modern Aime-la-Plagne). Renamed to Forum Claudii Ceutronum under Claudius (41–54 AD), probably when the Ceutrones were granted Latin Rights, it became the chief town of Alpes Graiae, one of the two divisions of the province of Alpes Graiae et Poeninae. The procurator of the province had an occasional residence in the Ceutronian chief town. In Late Antiquity, the city lost its position to Darentasia (Moûtiers), which became the capital of the Diocese of Tarentaise in 426.

History 
In the mid-1st century BC, the Ceutrones are mentioned by Julius Caesar as a tribe hostile to Rome. In what appears to be a concerted attack, they attempted to prevent his passage through the upper Durance along with the Caturiges and Graioceli in 58 BC.

Culture 
The Ceutrones were possibly of Celto-Ligurian origin.

Economy 
The Ceutrones were known for copper mining. They also produced a renowned cheese named vatusicus.

See also 
Allobroges
Graioceli
Medulli
Ancient Diocese of Tarentaise

References

Primary sources

References 

. 024602/2003-09-05.

 
Historical Celtic peoples
Gauls
Tribes of pre-Roman Gaul
Tribes involved in the Gallic Wars
Savoie